House of Hope is the second album by American singer/songwriter Toni Childs, released in 1991. It was Childs' second and final album for A&M.

The album's title track, "House of Hope," was included in the 1991 film Thelma and Louise, and appeared on the film's soundtrack album.

The album peaked at #115 on the Billboard charts.

Critical reception
People called it "a record nearly bereft of the colorful melodies and joint-jolting rhythms that distinguished Childs’s first outing." Trouser Press wrote that "the album raises more provocative questions than Union, but it misses that album’s celebratory quality."

Track listing
All songs written by Toni Childs and David Ricketts except where noted.

"I've Got to Go Now" 6:27
"Next to You" 5:15 (Toni Childs)
"House of Hope" 4:51
"Daddy's Song" 6:37 (Toni Childs, David Ricketts, David Rhodes)
"Heaven's Gate" 5:15
"The Dead Are Dancing" 4:31
"I Want to Walk With You" 5:02 (Toni Childs, David Ricketts, David Rhodes)
"Where's the Light" 5:33
"Put This Fire Out" 5:43
"Three Days" 4:14

Personnel
Toni Childs – vocals
Andy Summers – guitar
Tony Guerrero – horn
Jim Keltner – percussion
Brent Lewis – percussion
Reggie Burrell – background vocals
Vinnie Colaiuta – drums
Luis Conte – percussion
Scott Crago – drums
Teresa DeLucio – background vocals
Denny Fangheiser – drums
David Hidalgo – guitar, accordion
Barbara Imhoff – harp
Rick Marotta – drums
Jill Mele – background vocals
Tim Pierce – guitar
David Rhodes – guitar
David Ricketts – bass, guitar, drums, keyboards
Chas Sandford – guitar
John Philip Shenale – keyboards, programming
Crystal Wilson – background vocals
Penni Wilson 
Will Donato – horn
Tony Maynahan - horn
Jerry Jr. Watts – bass
Jeff Martin – keyboards

Charts

Weekly charts

Year-end charts

Certifications

References

1991 albums
Toni Childs albums
A&M Records albums